Eagle III is an emergency air and ground medical transportation program, in partnership with Bellin Hospital, St. Vincent Hospital and County Rescue Services, all in Green Bay, Wisconsin.  Services are provided via ground ambulance, helicopter, turboprop or jet aircraft to and from medical facilities or accident scenes. The Eagle III program has been in operation since 1997.

Eagle III utilizes the following transport vehicles:

American Eurocopter EC-135 helicopter, Super King Air 200 fixed wing aircraft, Cessna Citation II jet aircraft and Specialized critical care ambulances

Aircraft are operated by Air Methods and Direct Charter.

Objectives
The primary mission for Eagle III is emergency air medical services to include scene flights and transport of critically ill or injured patients to facilities with specialized or greater levels of care. In addition to this, Eagle III also provides air support to local law enforcement agencies upon request due to its prime location and ability to rapidly deploy aircraft. Eagle III also has flown support missions for the U.S. Secret Service during presidential visits.

Aircraft
Eagle III’s primary aircraft is a Eurocopter EC 135 (N135CR), operated by Air Methods.

Eagle III also offers nation-wide fixed wing airplane service to transport patients on long distance flights or when weather is lower than helicopter minimums.  The aircraft are twin engine airplanes with all weather capability. Whether the patient is in Wisconsin or across the country, Eagle III can provide safe, reliable transport. Fixed wing aircraft are operated by Direct Charter.

In the past the Eagle III program has operated a Bell 407 (N407CR) which has been retired, and a Messerschmitt-Bölkow-Blohm Bo 105 (N202LF) which was lost in an accident on April 13, 2006.

References

External links
 Eagle III home page

Rescue agencies
Air ambulance services in the United States
Medical and health organizations based in Wisconsin